Lake Jackson, covering 3,212 acres (12.95 km), is located within the city of Sebring, Florida.  Sebring is the county seat of Highlands County.  Lake Jackson, a healthy freshwater lake, is approximately 25 feet (8 m) at its deepest.  Most of the area is fairly shallow.  The water is clear as compared to most lakes and the shores are sandy.

The lake has various boat ramps, including the popular public ramp at Veterans Beach on the lake's west side.  Most ramps are private and there are many private beaches.  Three public swimming beaches exist. One at Veterans Beach, at the north end of Lake Jackson, and Hidden Beach, near Faith Lutheran Church, and City Pier Beach is located just to the west of downtown Sebring. City Pier Beach was closed for five years but reopened in 2013. It remains an active public beach.
Crescent Beach is a small community beach located at the end of Crescent Drive just off of S.E. Lakeview Dr. A public fishing dock is to the north side of the swimming beach near the downtown.

The shore is largely surrounded by homes.  A large condominium, The Fountainhead, is on the east side.  The only areas not surrounded by residential property are the southwest side, which is bordered by U.S. Highway 27, and an area on the north cove containing a large orange grove.

The lake is almost round, with the exception of the north cove, a smaller rounded area.  Lake Jackson is connected to Little Lake Jackson by a short canal.

Due to the death of novelist Rex Beach in his lakefront home, the lake was renamed Rex Beach Lake in his honor, but the name did not last.

References
 Florida Lakewatch

External links

Jackson
Sebring, Florida
Jackson